Abel Ricardo Laudonio (30 August 1938 – 12 August 2014) was an Argentinian lightweight boxer. As an amateur he competed in the 1956 and 1960 Olympics and won a bronze medal in the lightweight division in 1960. In 1961 he turned professional and in 1965 challenged Nicolino Locche for the South American lightweight title, but lost by decision. Laudonio retired the same year with a record of 48 wins (37 by knockout), 6 losses, and 2 draws. He later ran a fitness center in Buenos Aires.

1956 Olympic Results
Below is the record of Abel Laudino, an Argentine flyweight boxer who competed at the 1956 Melbourne Olympics:

 Round of 32: bye
 Round of 16: lost to Terence Spinks (Great Britain) on points

Later years

In 2004, Laudonio was diagnosed with Alzheimer's disease. He had a stroke in 2009, and died from another stroke in 2014.

References

External links

 databaseOlympics

1938 births
2014 deaths
Lightweight boxers
Olympic boxers of Argentina
Boxers at the 1956 Summer Olympics
Boxers at the 1960 Summer Olympics
Olympic medalists in boxing
Olympic bronze medalists for Argentina
Argentine male boxers
Medalists at the 1960 Summer Olympics
Boxers at the 1959 Pan American Games
Pan American Games gold medalists for Argentina
Pan American Games medalists in boxing
Medalists at the 1959 Pan American Games
Boxers from Buenos Aires
People with Alzheimer's disease